The Devil Don't Sleep is the fourth studio album by American country rock singer Brantley Gilbert. It was released on January 27, 2017, via Valory Music Group. The album includes the singles "The Weekend" and "The Ones That Like Me". Gilbert wrote or co-wrote all sixteen tracks.

Critical reception
Rating it 4 out of 5 stars, Stephen Thomas Erlewine of Allmusic wrote that "he rarely seems dour on the bigger, bolder tunes, all of which sound like they're just on the verge of cutting loose" and "He's more of a romantic, specializing in lightly soulful slow-burners that wind up complementing his minor-key anthems." Chuck Yarborough of The Plain Dealer rated the album "C+", saying that "His songwriting style is exactly what the under-30 country fan likes", citing the first half of the album as more mainstream and contemporary in sound, while highlighting the lyrics of "Baby Be Crazy" and "Three Feet of Water", concluding his review with "Those 'young country' tunes lead it off, and are just about guaranteed hits...But it's those second-half songs that show the possibility of longevity."

Commercial performance
The album debuted at No. 1 on Billboards Top Country Albums chart with sales of 66,000 copies in the first week, which made it the top selling album of the week in the United States. It also debuted at No. 2 on Billboard 200 based on 77,000 units (traditional sales plus tracks and streams). The album sold a further 19,000 copies in the second week. The album has sold 218,200 copies in the US as of August 2018.

Track listing

Personnel 
 Jess Franklin – backing vocals, electric guitar
 BJ Golden – guitar, mandolin, bouzouki
 Vicki Hampton – backing vocals
 Noah Henson – guitar
 Dann Huff – mandolin, bouzouki, keyboards, resonator guitar, banjo, guitar, synth bass
 Charlie Judge – keyboards
 Kim Keyes – backing vocals
 Stephen Lewis – bass
 Chris McHugh – drums
 Gordon Mote – piano
 Ben Sims – drums
 Jimmie Lee Sloas – bass
 Russell Terrell – backing vocals
 Ilya Toshinsky – acoustic guitar
 Jonathan Yudkin – mandolin, cello
Personnel on deluxe edition tracks
 Dan Agee – acoustic guitar, electric guitar
 Bruce Bouton – steel guitar 
 Steve Brewster – drums
 Jimmy Carter – bass
 J. T. Corenflos – electric guitar
 Shannon Forrest – drums
 Mark Hill – bass
 Jedd Hughes – electric guitar
 Troy Johnson – backing vocals
 Jeff King – electric guitar 
 Wes Little – drums
 Pat McGrath – acoustic guitar
 Ethan Pilsner – bass
 Adam Shoenfeld – electric guitar
 Jason Webb – keyboards

Charts

Album

Weekly charts

Year-end charts

Singles

Certifications

References 

2017 albums
Brantley Gilbert albums
Big Machine Records albums
Albums produced by Dann Huff